John Dryden was an association football player who represented New Zealand at international level.

Dryden made a single appearance in an official international for the All Whites in a 4–1 win over Australia on 30 June 1923.

References 

Year of birth missing
New Zealand association footballers
New Zealand international footballers
Year of death missing
Association footballers not categorized by position